Alan Kováč (born 22 May 1993) is a Slovak footballer who currently plays for Soroksár as a forward.

Club career

ŠK Slovan Bratislava
Kováč made his Corgoň Liga debut for Slovan Bratislava on 31 May 2014 entering in as a substitute in place of Pavel Fořt in a derby match against Spartak Trnava.

References

External links
 ŠK Slovan Bratislava profile
 
 Futbalnet profile

1993 births
Living people
Footballers from Bratislava
Slovak footballers
Slovak expatriate footballers
Slovakia youth international footballers
Association football forwards
ŠK Slovan Bratislava players
FC DAC 1904 Dunajská Streda players
ŠK Senec players
FK Iskra Borčice players
ŠKF Sereď players
FK Senica players
Győri ETO FC players
Nyíregyháza Spartacus FC players
Kazincbarcikai SC footballers
Soroksár SC players
Slovak Super Liga players
2. Liga (Slovakia) players
Nemzeti Bajnokság II players
Slovak expatriate sportspeople in Hungary
Expatriate footballers in Hungary